Lakso is a spicy Indonesian noodle dish served in savoury yellowish coconut milk-based soup, flavoured with fish, and sprinkled with fried shallots. The dish is one of the regional specialty of Palembang, the capital of South Sumatra, Indonesia.

Lakso is often described as the Palembang-style laksa. However, actually it is quite different from recipes for laksa common in neighboring Malaysia and Singapore. Lakso is quite similar to  burgo, although burgo is folded rice pancake and its soup has a whitish color. In Palembang, lakso together with burgo is a popular choice for breakfast.

See also

 Pempek
 Laksa
 Palembangese cuisine
 Rice noodles

Notes

Palembang cuisine
Indonesian noodles